Dufferin was an electoral riding in Ontario, Canada. It was created in 1875 and was abolished into Dufferin–Simcoe before the 1934 election.

Members of Provincial Parliament

References

Former provincial electoral districts of Ontario